Utricularia amethystina, the Florida purple bladderwort, is a variable species of terrestrial bladderwort native to Bolivia, Brazil, Guyana, Peru, and south-west Florida. The small flowers can be purple, lilac, white, bluish, cream, or bright yellow, and are also highly variable in size and shape.

See also
List of Utricularia species

References

External links
USDA Plant Profile page
Index of Utricularia photos online
International Carnivorous Plant Society

Carnivorous plants of North America
Carnivorous plants of South America
Flora of Bolivia
Flora of Brazil
Flora of Florida
Flora of Guyana
Flora of Peru
amethystina
Plants described in 1838